Elections to the Puducherry Legislative Assembly were held in March 1980, to elect members of the 30 constituencies in Puducherry (then known as Pondicherry), in India. The Dravida Munnetra Kazhagam won the popular vote and the most seats, and M. D. R. Ramachandran was appointed as the Chief Minister of Puducherry.

Results

Elected members

See also
List of constituencies of the Puducherry Legislative Assembly
1980 elections in India

References

External links
  

1980 State Assembly elections in India
State Assembly elections in Puducherry
1980s in Pondicherry